Schneeberg may refer to:

 Schneeberg (Alps), a mountain in Lower Austria
 Schneeberg (Fichtelgebirge), a mountain in Bavaria
 Schneeberg, Bavaria, a town in Lower Franconia
 Schneeberg, Saxony, a town in the Ore Mountains
 Ervin Schneeberg (1919–1995), American businessman and politician